The 1974 Montreal Alouettes finished the season in 1st place in the East Conference with a 9–5–2 record and won the Grey Cup.They defeated their rival Edmonton Eskimos, in the first of five Grey Cups between the two in the 1970s. Sonny Wade came off the bench to lead his team to another Grey Cup on a rain soaked field.

Preseason

Regular season

Standings

Schedule

Postseason

Grey Cup

Awards and honours

References

External links
Official Site

Montreal Alouettes seasons
Grey Cup championship seasons
James S. Dixon Trophy championship seasons
1974 Canadian Football League season by team
1970s in Montreal
1974 in Quebec